The Solbus Solcity 12 LNG is a fully low-floor single-decker bus manufactured by Solbus SA in Poland. The bus is the first to be powered by liquid natural gas in Mainland Europe. Fueling the bus takes 3–5 minutes.

The first LNG Solcity's were produced in 2010; the model was perfected at the end of 2011. In 2012, the bus was exhibited in the Hannower IAA motor show.

Technical sheets

Buses of Poland
Low-floor buses
Natural gas vehicles